The Liverpool Half Marathon is an annual road running event held on the streets of Liverpool, United Kingdom. It has previously been sponsored by Vitality and Mizuno Corporation.

In 2014 the Liverpool Half Marathon was named as one of the eight events in the Vitality Run Series alongside the Brighton Half Marathon, Reading Half Marathon, Oxford Half Marathon, Bath Half Marathon, North London Half Marathon, Hackney Half Marathon and British 10k London Run.

Course 

Generally the course starts in Liverpool town centre and goes up Parliament Street then turns south towards Sefton Park and Otterspool before proceeding north along the waterfront back towards the centre.

From 2016 onwards the event featured a 10-mile race running along a similar route.

Past winners 

Key: 

The route of 2018 event was found to be slightly short and so will not count as a course record 

All Jeska's athletics results were declared null and void when she failed to produce samples of her testosterone levels.

References

External links
 Official website

Sports competitions in Liverpool
Half marathons in the United Kingdom
Recurring sporting events established in 1994